The River Slang (Irish: Abhainn na Stéille), also known as the Dundrum Slang or the Dundrum River, a tributary of the River Dodder, is a stream which rises on Three Rock Mountain, County Dublin.  It is in the jurisdiction of Dun Laoghaire-Rathdown County Council.

Course
From Three Rock Woods on the northern slopes of Three Rock Mountain, the Slang flows down through Ticknock, passing Ballinteer north to Dundrum, where it (sometimes known this far as "Ticknock Stream" or "River Ann") receives the Wyckham Stream, and then loops east, north, and west, coming to a mill pond north of the Dundrum Town Centre retail complex.  The Slang then runs north via Windy Arbour and subsequently joins the River Dodder at Milltown, near the Nine Arches viaduct, now used by the Luas.

The small Wyckham Stream, joining from the west, is a natural tributary, visible on early maps, but was later connected to the Little Dargle River, further west, to take some of the flow of that river into the Slang, to increase the supply for powering of mills.

Today there is a walk made by the County Council from south Dundrum to Marlay Park, along part of the Slang, the Wyckham Stream, and part of the Little Dargle.

History
The Slang was a small stream in a grassy glen behind Dundrum's main street, near the old Dundrum Castle, and children used to play there until late in the 1960s, from when it was confined more and more by modern developments.

Its name is from the archaic English term slang, meaning "long, narrow piece of land." Its Irish name is abhainn na Stéille, "river of the strip [of land]".

Flooding
According to the local authorities and the Office of Public Works, the Slang has a notable record of flooding.

In October 2011, after torrential rain on "the Three Rock", the Slang burst its banks at the mill pond below the old castle, flooding the "Town Centre" shopping mall to a depth of at least 15 cm - a 'once in a century' occurrence according to reports, and featuring in video reports on YouTube and similar sites.

References

Bibliography

River Dodder
Slang
Dundrum, Dublin
Milltown, Dublin